Gambier's Advocate is a lost 1915 American drama silent film directed by James Kirkwood, Sr. and written by Ronald MacDonald. The film stars Hazel Dawn, James Kirkwood, Sr., Fuller Mellish, Dorothy Bernard, Robert Broderick and Maude Odell. The film was released on June 17, 1915, by Paramount Pictures.

Plot

Cast 
Hazel Dawn as Clarissa
James Kirkwood, Sr. as Stephen Gambier
Fuller Mellish as Cyrus Vane
Dorothy Bernard as Gene Vane
Robert Broderick as Mr. Muir
Maude Odell as Mrs. Muir

References

External links 
 
 

1915 films
1910s English-language films
Silent American drama films
1915 drama films
Paramount Pictures films
Lost American films
Films directed by James Kirkwood Sr.
American black-and-white films
American silent feature films
1915 lost films
Lost drama films
1910s American films